is a Japanese football player for Oita Trinita.

Club statistics
Updated to 25 February 2019.

References

External links

Profile at Vissel Kobe

1994 births
Living people
Association football people from Hyōgo Prefecture
Japanese footballers
J1 League players
J2 League players
J3 League players
Vissel Kobe players
J.League U-22 Selection players
Oita Trinita players
Association football midfielders